The 2000–01 OPJHL season is the eighth season of the Ontario Provincial Junior A Hockey League (OPJHL). The thirty-seven teams of the North, South, East, and West divisions competed in a 49-game schedule.

Come February, the top eight teams of each division competed for the Frank L. Buckland Trophy, the OPJHL championship.  The winner of the Buckland Cup, the Thornhill Rattlers, went on to win the Dudley Hewitt Cup as Central Canadian Champions.  The Rattlers were not successful in winning the 2001 Royal Bank Cup.

Changes
Port Hope Buzzards become the Port Hope Clippers

Final standings

Note: GP = Games played; W = Wins; L = Losses; OTL = Overtime losses; SL = Shootout losses; GF = Goals for; GA = Goals against; PTS = Points; x = clinched playoff berth; y = clinched division title; z = clinched conference title

2000-01 Frank L. Buckland Trophy Playoffs

Division Quarter-final
Milton Merchants defeated Bramalea Blues 4-games-to-3
Brampton Capitals defeated Streetsville Derbys 4-games-to-1
Mississauga Chargers defeated Buffalo Lightning 4-games-to-2
Georgetown Raiders defeated Hamilton Kiltys 4-games-to-3
Kingston Voyageurs defeated Peterborough Bees 4-games-to-2
Lindsay Muskies defeated Syracuse Jr. Crunch 4-games-to-none
Wellington Dukes defeated Bowmanville Eagles 4-games-to-1
Trenton Sting defeated Cobourg Cougars 4-games-to-3
Newmarket Hurricanes defeated Durham Huskies 4-games-to-none
Stouffville Spirit defeated Parry Sound Shamrocks 4-games-to-none
Couchiching Terriers defeated Ajax Axemen 4-games-to-none
Collingwood Blues defeated Aurora Tigers 4-games-to-1
Markham Waxers defeated Oshawa Legionaires 4-games-to-none
Wexford Raiders defeated Vaughan Vipers 4-games-to-2
Thornhill Rattlers defeated Huntsville Wildcats 4-games-to-none
St. Michael's Buzzers defeated Pickering Panthers 4-games-to-1
Division Semi-final
Milton Merchants defeated Mississauga Chargers 4-games-to-1
Brampton Capitals defeated Hamilton Kiltys 4-games-to-1
Newmarket Hurricanes defeated Collingwood Blues 4-games-to-1
Couchiching Terriers defeated Stouffville Spirit 4-games-to-2
Thornhill Rattlers defeated St. Michael's Buzzers 4-games-to-none
Wexford Raiders defeated Markham Waxers 4-games-to-3
Lindsay Muskies defeated Kingston Voyageurs 4-games-to-none
Trenton Sting defeated Wellington Dukes 4-games-to-1
Division Final
Milton Merchants defeated Brampton Capitals 4-games-to-3
Couchiching Terriers defeated Newmarket Hurricanes 4-games-to-3
Thornhill Rattlers defeated Wexford Raiders 4-games-to-2
Trenton Sting defeated Lindsay Muskies 4-games-to-3
Semi-final
Couchiching Terriers defeated Milton Merchants 4-games-to-2
Thornhill Rattlers defeated Trenton Sting 4-games-to-1
Final
Thornhill Rattlers defeated Couchiching Terriers 4-games-to-1

Dudley Hewitt Cup Championship
Best-of-7
Thornhill Rattlers defeated Rayside-Balfour Sabrecats (NOJHL) 4-games-to-3
Rayside-Balfour 3 - Thornhill 2
Thornhill 4 - Rayside-Balfour 1
Thornhill 5 - Rayside-Balfour 1
Thornhill 6 - Rayside-Balfour 5
Rayside-Balfour 3 - Thornhill 2 OT
Rayside-Balfour 4 - Thornhill 1
Thornhill 3 - Rayside-Balfour 2 2OT

2001 Royal Bank Cup Championship
Hosted by Flin Flon Bombers in Flin Flon, Manitoba.  The Thornhill Rattlers finished in last place.

Round Robin
Camrose Kodiaks (AJHL) defeated Thornhill Rattlers 4-1
St. Jerome Panthers (QJAAAHL) defeated Thornhill Rattlers 5-4
Flin Flon Bombers (SJHL) defeated Thornhill Rattlers 5-2
Weyburn Red Wings (SJHL) defeated Thornhill Rattlers 5-3

Scoring leaders
Note: GP = Games played; G = Goals; A = Assists; Pts = Points; PIM = Penalty minutes

See also
 2001 Royal Bank Cup
 Dudley Hewitt Cup
 List of OJHL seasons
 Northern Ontario Junior Hockey League
 Superior International Junior Hockey League
 Greater Ontario Junior Hockey League
 2000 in ice hockey
 2001 in ice hockey

References

External links
 Official website of the Ontario Junior Hockey League
 Official website of the Canadian Junior Hockey League

Ontario Junior Hockey League seasons
OPJHL